Gibal was a commander of the Ostrogoths in the final stages of the Gothic War against the Eastern Roman Empire.

Procopius mentions Gibal along with Indulf (Gundulf) and Scipuar as "the most notable among the Goths" under Totila. Together with Gibal and Indulf he was ordered to capture Ancona in Picenum. Totila also gave them a fleet of 47 ships to aid them in the siege. While Scipuar led the siege of Ancona, Gibal and Indulf assumed command of naval forces. In the fall of 551 they suffered a crushing defeat at the Battle of Sena Gallica, during which Gibal was captured while Indulf escaped.

References

Sources

6th-century Ostrogothic people
Gothic warriors
Year of birth unknown
People of the Gothic War (535–554)
Year of death unknown
Prisoners of war held by the Byzantine Empire